Cap au Gris is an unincorporated community in Lincoln County, in the U.S. state of Missouri.

History
Cap au Gris was platted in 1845. The community took its name from historic Fort Cap au Gris, which once stood near the town site. A post office called Cap au Gris was established in 1845, and remained in operation until 1883.

References

Unincorporated communities in Lincoln County, Missouri
Unincorporated communities in Missouri